Lieutenant Colonel Sir Gerard Smith,  (12 December 1839 – 28 October 1920), a member of the Smith and Carington family, was a business leader, politician, and Governor of Western Australia from 1895 to 1900.

Early life
Gerard Smith was born on 12 December 1839 in Pimlico, London. He was the third son of Martin Tucker Smith (1803–1880), politician, banker and director of the East India Co., and Louisa (Ridley) Smith. His paternal grandfather was John Smith (1767–1842), a banker and Tory Member of Parliament, and his maternal grandfather was Matthew White Ridley, a baronet.

Career
Smith joined the Royal Scots Fusiliers as an ensign in 1857 and briefly saw service in Canada, retiring from the army in 1874. He joined the family bank, Samuel Smith, Bros. & Co., and went on to become a business leader in Kingston-upon-Hull, being instrumental in the formation of the Hull and Barnsley Railway in 1880. He succeeded his second cousin William Carington as a Liberal MP for Wycombe from 1883 to 1885, and was a Groom in Waiting to Queen Victoria in the same period.

In 1895, Smith was appointed Governor of Western Australia and knighted. He served as Governor until 1900.

Freemasonry
Smith was a Freemason, being initiated into Studholme Lodge No. 1591 on 4 May 1880 at the age of 41.  He was subsequently passed to the Second Degree and raised to the Third Degree within two months, and on 17 January 1890, became Worshipful Master of the Lodge. As was usual, when he was appointed Governor of Western Australia he was also appointed Past Junior Grand Warden of United Grand Lodge of England.

In 1898 he was appointed District Grand Master of the District Grand Lodge of Western Australia. He was a supporter of the Grand Lodge movement then active in the colony, allowing his lodges to discuss the question. When the Grand Lodge of Western Australia was consecrated on 27 February 1900, he was elected as its first Grand Master.

However, as his term as Governor was rapidly drawing to a close, he remained Grand Master for only one year.

Death
Smith died in London on 28 October 1920. His wife predeceased him in 1915.

References

External links
 

1839 births
1920 deaths
Royal Scots Fusiliers officers
Governors of Western Australia
Liberal Party (UK) MPs for English constituencies
Knights Commander of the Order of St Michael and St George
UK MPs 1880–1885
Hull and Barnsley Railway
Australian Freemasons
Gerard
Colony of Western Australia people
People from Pimlico